ABPR may refer to:
Animal By-Products Regulations
Aberdeen and Briar Patch Railway
American Book Publishing Record